Qom Metro is a metro system serving the city of Qom, Iran, currently under construction. An extension of the monorail, plus two other brand new metro lines, are being considered as part of future plans.

Lines

Line A

Line A is an underground metro line currently under construction, due to open by the end of 2021.

Line M

Line M is a currently partially built monorail line. The line is planned to connect Fatima Masumeh Shrine to locations upstream and downstream of Qom River.  Construction commenced in 2009 and large sections including some stations were completed.  A two-car train was delivered in 2015 and some testing was carried out.  However in 2016 doubts about opening the system by the following year were raised.  Further construction was suspended soon after. As of 2021 no information is available on resumption of work. 

The line was originally planned to span the whole city East-West but it was cut to its current length.  An extension of the line may be considered in the future.

Other lines
Two other metro lines are being considered.

See also
Rapid transit in Iran

References

External links
 QOM METRO

Underground rapid transit systems in Iran
Standard gauge railways in Iran
Transportation in Qom Province
Qom
monorails